The Hauck House Museum is an  Italianate mansion located in the Dayton Street Historic District in the Old West End Neighborhood of Cincinnati, Ohio. It was built in 1870. The Hauck House has a striking façade of carved stone, and the spacious rooms have intricately painted ceilings, floors of parquet wood in elaborate patterns, marble mantels, and massive woodwork. 

John Hauck (1829–1896) was a German immigrant who established a prosperous Cincinnati brewery. The museum was established to promote an understanding of daily life and customs in late 19th-century urban Cincinnati through the preservation and interpretation of the Hauck House.

The residence had operated as a historic house museum but is no longer opened to the public. It is available for rental for events.

References

External links
Hauck House Photo
Hauck Mansion

Museums in Cincinnati
Defunct museums in Ohio
German-American culture in Cincinnati
German-American history
West End, Cincinnati